Edward L. Sadowsky (February 6, 1929 – November 11, 2021) was an American politician who served in the New York City Council from 1962 to 1989.

Sadowsky was born in Brooklyn in 1929. His father was a salesman. His mother was a bookkeeper. He had one sister.

Sadowsky became the head of the New York City Board of Education after unsuccessfully seeking the nomination of the Democratic Party to run for Queens Borough President of New York in 1986.  He was also unsuccessful in running for Mayor of New York City in 1989.

After leaving the Council in 1986, he became a full-time lawyer.

He died of acute respiratory failure on November 11, 2021, in Beachwood, Ohio, at age 92.

References

1929 births
2021 deaths
New York City Council members
New York (state) Democrats
Politicians from Brooklyn